Langebro (literally "Long Bridge") is a bascule bridge across the Inner Harbour of Copenhagen, Denmark, connecting Zealandside H. C. Andersens Boulevard to Amagerside Amager Boulevard. It is one of only two bridges to carry motor vehicles across the harbour in central Copenhagen, the other being Knippelsbro.

History

1690: The first Langebro

Completed in 1690, the first bridge located roughly where Langebro is today was known as Kalvebodbro (Kalvebod Bridge) and connected the Western Rampart's Rysensteen Bastion on Zealand with Christianshavn Rampart's Christianshavns Vold#Kalvebod Bastion on Christianshavn. It was a wooden structure with a drawbridge in the middle that allowed ships to pass. The bridge was built for the military but was also open to civilian pedestrians.

The bridge was refurbished several times. It was widened in 1875–76.

1903: The Swing Bridge

Plans for a new Langebro were first presented in 1885 but not realized until 1903. The new bridge was located 400 ft to the south of the old one, Vestre Boulevard (now H. C. Andersens Boulevard) and connected to the Amager Boulevard on the other side of the harbor. It was a swing bridge resting on nine stone pillars.

The swing bridge was both used for both trams and the Amagerbanen railroad.

1939: The temporary bridge
With growing automobile traffic, the new bridge soon became outdated and a new temporary bridge was constructed in 1930. The bridge was subject to sabotage on 23 March 1945.

1954

The temporary bridge was replaced by the current Langebro in 1954.

Lille Langebro
Lille Langebro pedestrian and cycling bridge north of Langebro was completed in 2019.

Cultural references
 Søren Kierkegaard's pseudonymous author, Hilarius Bookbinder, mentions the bridge in Stages on Life's Way (1845): "Langebro [Long Bridge] has its name from its length; that is, as a bridge it is long but is not much as a roadway, as one easily finds out by passing over it. Then when one is standing on the other side in Christianshavn, it in turn seems that the bridge must nevertheless be long, because one is far, very far away from Copenhagen." (Stages on Life's Way p. 259)
 Langebro is a play by Hans Christian Andersen, named for the bridge in Copenhagen.
 The Danish-American 1961 giant monster film Reptilicus includes Scenes from a panic-stricken Langebro are featured in.
 Langebro is seen in many of the Olsen-banden films, including The Olsen Gang, The Olsen Gang in a Fix (1:14:47) and The Olsen Gang on the Track (1:29:16).
 "Langebro" is the name of Gasolin's 1971 adaption of Joan Baez's version of Geordie, where the setting is shifted from London to Copenhagen and Langebro takes the place of London Bridge.

Gallery

See also
 List of bridges in Copenhagen

References

External links

 Source/Unage

Bridges in Copenhagen
Arch bridges in Denmark
Bascule bridges
Road bridges in Denmark
Former railway bridges
Listed bridges in Denmark
Listed transport buildings and structures in Copenhagen
Bridges completed in 1954
1954 establishments in Denmark
Port of Copenhagen